Kyundyade is a rural locality (a selo) and the administrative center of Kyundyadinsky Rural Okrug of Nyurbinsky District in the Sakha Republic, Russia, located  from Nyurba, the administrative center of the district. Its population as of the 2002 Census was 985.

See also
 Djarkhan

References

Notes

Sources
Official website of the Sakha Republic. Registry of the Administrative-Territorial Divisions of the Sakha Republic. Nyurbinsky District. 

Rural localities in Nyurbinsky District